The Divine Intervention Tour was the tenth concert tour by American singer, songwriter, actress, comedian, and film producer Bette Midler. The tour started on May 8, 2015 in Hollywood, Florida, and concluded on July 19, 2015 in London, England. The tour traveled through North America, specifically the United States and Canada, and Europe, specifically parts of England and Scotland.

This was Midler's first global tour in over a decade, and promoted her October 2014 album It is the Girls!

David Warner of Creative Loafing Tampa said of the Tampa show, "...the sass, the sashay, the big sound and the unabashed emotion were all in such top form that you couldn’t help but marvel: This woman's how old?''

Set list

This set list is representative of the show on May 8, 2015. It does not represent all concerts for the duration of the tour.

 "Divine Intervention"
 "I Look Good"
 "I've Still Got My Health"
 "Tenderly"
 "Throw It Away"
 "Be My Baby"
 "Tell Him"
 "He's Sure the Boy I Love"
 "Da Doo Ron Ron"
 "Bei Mir Bist du Schön"
 "Waterfalls"
 "Teach Me Tonight"
 "Everybody Knows"
 "I Think It's Going to Rain Today"
 "I Put a Spell on You"
 "Optimistic Voices"
 "Bird in the Hand"
 "Beast of Burden"
 "Spring Can Really Hang You Up the Most"
 "Miss Otis Regrets"
 "The Rose"
 "From a Distance"
 "Stay With Me"
 "Wind Beneath My Wings"
 "Boogie Woogie Bugle Boy"
 "Friends" (Final 4 shows only)
 "Soul to Soul" (The Temptations cover) (Final show London July 19)

Shows

References

External links
Bettemidler.com
Axs.com
Setlist.fm

2015 concert tours
Bette Midler concert tours